Omija-hwachae or magnolia berry punch is a sweet and tangy hwachae (punch) made with magnolia berries—omija in Korean. The reddish-pink punch is typically served during hot summer days.

Preparation 
The base is made by infusing dried magnolia berries in water until the color develops, sieving the liquid through a fine cloth, then sweetening with honey, sugar or syrup. It is served with decorative slices of Asian pear and pine nuts floating at the top.

See also 
 Omija-cha – magnolia berry tea

References 

Hwachae
Korean drinks